Bardot may refer to:

Music 
 Bardot (English band), a British rock band active in the late 1970s
 Bardot (Australian band), an Australian female pop group, active from 1999 to 2002
 Bardot (album), the self-titled debut album by Bardot

People with the name 
 Brigitte Bardot (born 1934), French actress, fashion model and animal activist
 Babette Bardot (born 1940), Swedish actress
 Bessie Bardot (born 1974), Australian model, writer and television presenter, born Bessie Wilson
 Dino Bardot (born 1972), Scottish musician
 Charles Bardot (born 1904), French footballer
 Mijanou Bardot (born 1938), French actress and writer, sister of Brigitte

Other uses 
 MV Brigitte Bardot, an Australian record-setting trimaran yacht
 Bardot (TV series), a 2023 drama television series

See also
 Bardo (disambiguation)
 17062 Bardot, an asteroid named after Brigitte Bardot